17 Sagittarii is a binary star system in the zodiac constellation of Sagittarius, located 675 light years from the Sun. With a combined apparent visual magnitude of 6.89 it is below the normal limit of visibility to the naked eye. The system is moving closer to the Earth with a heliocentric radial velocity of −14 km/s. J. Allen Hynek (1938) found an initial spectral type of G5 + A5 for the pair. It was first resolved by Harold A. McAlister (1978), who found an angular separation of  along a position angle of 

The magnitude 7.24 primary component is an evolved giant star with a stellar classification of G8/K0 III, indicating it has exhausted the hydrogen at its core and expanded off the main sequence. It is radiating 73 times the Sun's luminosity from its enlarged photosphere at an effective temperature of 4,700 K. The companion is a hot A-type star of uncertain luminosity class, with a visual magnitude of 8.89.

References

G-type giants
K-type giants
Binary stars
Durchmusterung objects
Sagittarius (constellation)
Sagittarii, 17
167570
089567